Perfecting the Art of Longing is a Canadian short documentary film, directed by Kitra Cahana and released in 2021. The film is a portrait of Cahana's father Ronnie, a former rabbi who has been living in long-term care since suffering a stroke which left him quadriplegic and unable to speak, and the family's efforts to stay connected to him remotely during the COVID-19 pandemic in Canada.

The film premiered in October 2021 at the Festival du nouveau cinéma.

The film won the Betty Youson Award for best Canadian short documentary at the 2022 Hot Docs Canadian International Documentary Festival, and the Prix Iris for Best Short Documentary at the 24th Quebec Cinema Awards in 2022. It was released as a New York Times Op-Doc.

The film received a Canadian Screen Award nomination for Best Short Documentary at the 11th Canadian Screen Awards in 2023.

References

External links

2021 films
2021 short documentary films
Canadian short documentary films
National Film Board of Canada documentaries
National Film Board of Canada short films
Jewish Canadian films
Documentary films about the COVID-19 pandemic
2020s English-language films
2020s Canadian films